Muhammad Dilawar Khanji (Gujarati: મુહમ્મદ દિલાવર ખાન,) (23 June 1918 – 30 July 1989) was a Pakistani politician who was 11th Governor of Sindh from 1 March 1976 to 5 July 1977. He also claimed to be the titular Nawab of Junagarh from 1959–89.

Early life 
Muhammad Dilawar was born in Junagarh to Muhammad Mahabat Khan III who was the last Nawab of Junagarh.

Politics and Later Life 
He was appointed as the Governor of Sindh in 1976 by Zulfiqar Ali Bhutto. On 5 July 1977, chief of army staff Muhammad Zia-ul-Haq deposed Bhutto in a bloodless coup. General Zia-ul-Haq imposed martial law in the country and dissolved the Provincial and Federal governments. As a result of Coup d'état 1977 , Nawab Khanji was removed as a Governor of Sindh. He died of lung cancer on 30 July 1989. His eldest son, Muhammad Jahangir Khanji, is now the titular claimant to the defunct Junagarh Nawabi title.

References

External links 
 - Junagadh State
 JUNAGADH - Royal Family Of IndiaRoyal Family Of India
 The Story Of The Accession Of The Princely State Of Junagarh
 Dilawar Khanji - CricketArchive

1918 births
1989 deaths
Pakistani people of Gujarati descent
11th
People from Gujarat
People from Junagadh
Muhajir people